Raphitoma antonjanseni is an extinct species of sea snail, a marine gastropod mollusc in the family Raphitomidae.

Description
The length of the shell reaches a length of 16 mm.

Distribution
Fossils of this extinct marine species were found in Pliocene strata near Antwerp, Belgium.

References

 Marquet, R. 1998. The Pliocene turrid Gastropods of Belgium. Part 2; Conidae (genera Asthenotoma, Comarmondia, Cytharella, Mangelia, Lusitanops, Raphitoma and Philbertia). Bulletin de ITnstitut royal des Sciences naturelles de Belgique, Sciences de la Terre 68: 263–287.

External links
 

antonjanseni
Gastropods described in 1998